Latinka Cove (‘Zaliv Latinka’ \'za-liv la-'tin-ka\) is the 1.95 km wide cove indenting for 1.65 km the northwest coast of Pefaur (Ventimiglia) Peninsula, Danco Coast on the Antarctic Peninsula.  It is entered east of Eckener Point and west of Binkos Point.  The head of the cove is fed by Poduene Glacier.

The cove is named after the settlement of Latinka in Southern Bulgaria.

Location
British mapping in 1978.

Maps
 British Antarctic Territory.  Scale 1:200000 topographic map.  DOS 610 Series, Sheet W 64 60.  Directorate of Overseas Surveys, UK, 1978.
 Antarctic Digital Database (ADD). Scale 1:250000 topographic map of Antarctica. Scientific Committee on Antarctic Research (SCAR). Since 1993, regularly upgraded and updated.

References
 Latinka Cove. SCAR Composite Antarctic Gazetteer.
 Bulgarian Antarctic Gazetteer. Antarctic Place-names Commission. (details in Bulgarian, basic data in English)

External links
 Latinka Cove. Copernix satellite image

Bulgaria and the Antarctic
Coves of Graham Land
Danco Coast